Bill Line (born August 11, 1948 in San Angelo, Texas) is a former American football defensive tackle in the National Football League for the Chicago Bears. He also was a member of The Hawaiians, Southern California Sun and Chicago Winds in the World Football League. He played college football at Southern Methodist University.

Early years
Line attended L.D. Bell High School. He accepted a football scholarship from the United States Air Force Academy. He transferred to Southern Methodist University after his freshman season. As a sophomore, he suffered a knee injury and was lost for most of the season.

Professional career
Line was signed as an undrafted free agent by the New Orleans Saints after the 1971 NFL Draft. He was tried at defensive tackle and defensive end during training camp. He was released on September 14.

After his release, he signed with the Roanoke Buckskins of the Atlantic Coast Football League, where he played at defensive tackle in 13 games.

In 1972, he signed as a free agent with the Dallas Cowboys. On August 17, he was traded to the Chicago Bears along with offensive tackle Bob Asher and a 1973 second round draft choice (#48-Gary Hrivnak) in exchange for quarterback Jack Concannon.

In 1972, he appeared in 13 games with 8 starts at right defensive tackle. On August 22, 1973, he was released.

In September 1974, he signed with The Hawaiians of the World Football League. He was released on September 23. In 1974, he signed with the Southern California Sun of the World Football League.

In 1975, he signed with the BC Lions of the Canadian Football League, where he was tried at offensive tackle. He was cut on July 20.

In 1975, he signed with the Chicago Winds of the World Football League. In 1975, he was acquired by the Southern California Sun after the Winds team folded.

On July 14, 1976, he was signed as a free agent by the Los Angeles Rams. He was released on August 3.

References

1948 births
Living people
People from San Angelo, Texas
Players of American football from Texas
American football defensive tackles
Air Force Falcons football players
SMU Mustangs football players
Chicago Bears players
The Hawaiians players
Southern California Sun players
Chicago Winds players
Military personnel from Texas